In English football, the FA Cup Final, the deciding match of the FA Cup competition, is considered the highest domestic honour for referees to be appointed to officiate.

The most recent final (2022) was refereed by Craig Pawson, with Dan Cook and Edward Smart as assistant referees; David Coote was fourth official and Paul Tierney as video assistant referee.

Selection
By modern tradition, individuals are appointed to referee an FA Cup Final only once, a rule that has been in practice since 1902. They may have previously appeared as an assistant referee or fourth official.

However, due to the global COVID-19 pandemic in 2020, the tradition was broken when Anthony Taylor became the first referee for over a century to officiate a second cup final. This was decided to allow a referee who would be officiating in a maiden final to experience the occasion as intended, with friends and family present and a stadium full of fans. In 2021, with the same crowd restrictions in place, Michael Oliver also refereed a second final.

David Elleray commented on his selection for the 1994 FA Cup Final:

Referees and assistants are chosen by the Football Association for their impartiality and their assessed performance scores for previous seasons. Only one referee has ever been replaced under the impartiality rule; Mike Dean agreed to pull out following questions in the media about him being able to referee a Cup Final involving Liverpool as he is from the Wirral, a peninsula situated near the city. Alan Wiley took his place.

Officials are informed of the appointment by the FA Referees' Secretary and sworn to secrecy until a public announcement can be made, usually the following day. There then follows a period of media attention resulting in interviews and features appearing in the national press.

Traditions
When the Cup Final is held at Wembley Stadium, traditions include the "Eve of the Final" rally at a central London location, where the match officials are guests of honour at a meal provided for by the Referees' Association. Many members of the Association including serving and past Cup Final referees also attend.

Speeches are made and the officials are presented with mementos of the occasion and invited to autograph their refereeing colleagues' Cup Final programmes. The referees usually sleep at White's Hotel, with FA protocol stating that they should not leave the grounds.

On the morning of the Cup Final, the officials take a pre-match walk through Hyde Park before travelling by limousine to Wembley. Once there they are obliged once more to autograph Cup Final programmes and are invited to join any VIPs in the banqueting hall.

Fees
For the 2013-14 season the officials' fees for the Cup Final were: referee and assistant referees £375 each; fourth official £320 and a souvenir medal each, plus travelling expenses.

Referees

1872-1977

1978-2009: Fourth official era

2010-2017: Fourth official and reserve assistant referee era

2018—: VAR and AVAR era

Referees with more than one final

References

 
Association football in England lists